Kenneth Grant (18 March 1900 – 7 September 1959) was a Scottish Roman Catholic clergyman who served as the Bishop of Argyll and the Isles from 1945 to 1959.

Born in Fort William, Scotland on 18 March 1900, he was educated at and St Peter's, Bearsden. He was ordained to the priesthood for the Archdiocese of Glasgow on 24 April 1927, however served as curate in Benbecula 1927-1928. He returned to Glasgow and was curate of St Mary Immaculate, Pollokshaws 1928-1939. He was a forces chaplain from 1939-1945 and curate of St Joseph's, Clarkston 1945-1946.

He was appointed the Bishop of the Diocese of Argyll and the Isles by the Holy See on 15 December 1945, and consecrated to the Episcopate on 27 February 1946. The principal consecrator was Archbishop Donald Alphonsus Campbell of Glasgow, and the principal co-consecrators were Bishop George Henry Bennett of Aberdeen and Bishop William Henry Mellon of Galloway.

He died in office on 7 September 1959, aged 59.

References 
 
 

1900 births
1959 deaths
People from Fort William, Highland
Roman Catholic bishops of Argyll and the Isles
20th-century Roman Catholic bishops in Scotland
Scottish Roman Catholic bishops